The Vultee XA-41 was originally ordered as a dive bomber. After combat experience led the Army Air Corps to believe dive-bombers were too vulnerable to enemy fighters, the contract was amended to change the role to low-level ground attack. Although the XA-41 was a potent weapons system, the design was overtaken by more advanced technology, and never entered production.

Design and development
The Vultee engineering team decided early in the design process to build the XA-41 (company Model 90) around the 3,000 hp Pratt & Whitney R-4360 Wasp Major four-row, 28-cylinder radial engine. The Model 90's large tapered wing resembled that of Vultee Model 72 – a two-seat attack aircraft/dive bomber better known as the Vultee Vengeance (A-31/A-35) – including a straight leading edge, forward-swept trailing edge, and pronounced dihedral on the outer wing panels.

Designed to carry both a large internal load and external stores, the XA-41 was large for a single-engine aircraft. The single-place cockpit, set in line with the wing root, was 15 ft (4.6 m) off the ground when the airplane was parked.

As operational priorities shifted during its development phase, the original order for two XA-41 prototypes was cancelled, although the USAAF pressed for the completion of one prototype as an engine testbed for the R-4360 (the same engine used by the Boeing B-50 Superfortress).

Operational history
Flying for the first time on 11 February 1944, the sole XA-41 (S/N 43-35124) proved to have good performance with a maximum speed of 354 mph reached in testing and "superb maneuverability, being able to out-turn a P-51B Mustang". However, with the reduction in military orders due to the approaching end of the war, no production contract was placed, and the aircraft was used as an engine testbed for the USAAF as well as being evaluated by the U.S. Navy in comparison with other contemporary attack aircraft, especially the Douglas AD-1 Skyraider and Martin AM-1 Mauler. After its Navy trials, the XA-41, bearing civil registration NX60373N, was consigned to the Pratt & Whitney division of United Aircraft to continue engine tests. These continued until 1950 before the XA-41 was scrapped.

Specifications (Vultee XA-41)

Notes

Bibliography
 McCullough, Anson. "Grind 'Em Out Ground Attack: The Search for the Elusive Fighter Bomber". Wings Vol. 25, No. 4, August 1995.
 Thompson, Jonathan. Vultee Aircraft 1932–1947. Santa Ana, California: Narkiewicz/Thompson, 1992. .

External links

 Vultee XA-41

Vultee A-41
XA-41
Single-engined tractor aircraft
Aircraft first flown in 1944
Mid-wing aircraft
Cancelled military aircraft projects of the United States